The House on the Dune (French: La maison dans la dune) is a 1934 French drama film directed by Pierre Billon and starring Pierre Richard-Willm, Madeleine Ozeray and Thomy Bourdelle. It is based on the 1932 novel The House on the Dune by Maxence Van Der Meersch. In 1952 the film was remade.

Cast
 Pierre Richard-Willm as Sylvain  
 Madeleine Ozeray as Pascaline  
 Thomy Bourdelle as Lourges  
 Colette Darfeuil as Germaine  
 Raymond Cordy 
 Odette Talazac 
 Made Siamé
Raymond Rognoni 
 Alexandre Rignault 
 Robert Ozanne 
 Geno Ferny 
 Teddy Michaud 
 Roger Legris 
 Franck Maurice

References

Bibliography 
 Philippe Rège. Encyclopedia of French Film Directors, Volume 1. Scarecrow Press, 2009.

External links 
 

1934 films
1934 drama films
French drama films
1930s French-language films
Films directed by Pierre Billon
French black-and-white films
1930s French films